Kluki may refer to the following places:
Kluki, Łódź Voivodeship (central Poland)
Kluki, Gmina Kałuszyn in Masovian Voivodeship (east-central Poland)
Kluki, Gmina Mińsk Mazowiecki in Masovian Voivodeship (east-central Poland)
Kluki, Pomeranian Voivodeship (north Poland)
Kluki, West Pomeranian Voivodeship (north-west Poland)